Stigmella panconista is a moth of the family Nepticulidae. It was described by Edward Meyrick in 1920. It is found in South Africa (it was described from Cape Town).

References

Endemic moths of South Africa
Nepticulidae
Moths of Africa
Moths described in 1920